Satamrai is a village in Ranga Reddy district in Telangana, India. It falls under Shamshabad mandal. Satamrai is considered as the Next Hub for businesses since it is connecting the road to Rajiv Gandhi International Airport.

References

Villages in Ranga Reddy district